Okihide Hikosaka is a neuroscience research professor who specializes in the mechanisms of motivation, learning, skill, decision-making, attention, and oculomotor control. His research into neuronal mechanisms of voluntary behavior and basal ganglia function created breakthroughs in the understanding of the neurochemistry behind information-seeking behavior and the efficacy of grouping motor sequence learning actions (otherwise known as “chunking”) in order to remember more than individual actions.

Hikosaka’s research proved that the brain is chemically wired to be rewarded with dopamine for learning information about the future.
“This result supports the notion that midbrain dopamine neurons are coding for both primitive and cognitive rewards.

So why do dopamine neurons treat information as a reward? It’s easy to see how treating information this way might be a useful evolutionary adaptation. For many animals, each day consists of numerous decisions that pertain to eating, reproducing and socializing. Obviously, having access to more relevant information – such as knowing where the food is located - allows animals to make better decisions. Furthermore, having access to such information might give us better control over our environment, thus increasing our chances of survival.” Hikosaka's research impacts the understanding of drug abuse, Parkinson’s and many other aspects of behavior and brain function and dysfunction.

Awards 

 Gruber Foundation Neuroscience Prize, 2018 
 Golden Brain Award from Minerva Foundation, 2015
 Tokizane Toshihiko Memorial Award, 1999
 Tsukahara Memorial Award, 1989

References 

Japanese neuroscientists
Year of birth missing (living people)
Living people